Sournia is a commune in the Pyrénées-Orientales department in the Occitanie region of south-western France. Its inhabitants are known as Sourniannais.

Geography
Sournia is a town of the Fenouillèdes, the languedocienne part of the Pyrénées-Orientales, in the canton of La Vallée de l'Agly and in the arrondissement of Prades. The river Désix runs through the village. Sournia is 22 km from Ille-sur-Têt and from Vinça, 24 km from Prades and from Saint-Paul-de-Fenouillet, 30 km from Latour-de-France and 34 km from Axat. The commune is covered by the quality wine standard AOC 'Côtes-du-Roussillon'. Sournia is crossed by the long-distance footpath, GR 36.

Administration

The current mayor of Sournia is Paul Blanc, a senator, of the centre-right and right wing party UMP founded by Jacques Chirac.

Population 

The population of Sournia in 2017 was 498 people. For some reason at the end of the 19th century, the population of Sournia seemed to have a reputation for having one of the longest longevity in France, even though this fact was not clearly verified.

Places of interest

 Ruins of the former church of Saint-Michel from the tenth century.
 The ancient church of Sainte-Félicité from the tenth and eleventh centuries.
 Church of Arsa from the twelfth century.

See also
Communes of the Pyrénées-Orientales department

References

Communes of Pyrénées-Orientales
Fenouillèdes